Antonio Prata (born 1977) is a Brazilian writer. He was born in São Paulo. He has published more than 10 books, including Douglas (2001), As pernas da tia Corália (2003), Adulterado (2009) and Meio intelectual, meio de esquerda (2010). He also writes for film and television and contributes a regular column to the newspaper Folha de Sao Paulo. 

He was named one of Granta's "Best Young Brazilian Writers" in 2012. He has won the Brasília Literature Award for best short story, and he was also a finalist for the Jabuti Prize in children's literature.

References

Brazilian writers